Prior to its shutdown, Aigle Azur operated or had operated to the following scheduled destinations as of September 2019.

References

Lists of airline destinations